Leonid Konstantinovich Polezhayev (born 30 January 1940 in Omsk) is the former governor of Omsk Oblast. He is a hydro-engineer. In 1991 he became head of the administration of Omsk Oblast.

Honours and awards
 Order of Merit for the Fatherland;
3rd class (30 January 2006) – for outstanding contribution to the socio-economic development of the field and many years of honest work
4th class (11 December 2001) – for outstanding contribution to the socio-economic development of the field and many years of honest work
 Order of Honour (2 May 1996) – for services to the state and many years of diligent work
 Order of the Badge of Honour
 Order of the Red Banner of Labour
 Order of Friendship, 2nd class (Kazakhstan)
 Medal "For military cooperation" (Russian Federal Security Service, 2006)
 Medal "For promoting drug control bodies" (Federal Drug Control Service of Russia, 2007)
 Corresponding Member of the Russian Academy of Engineering Sciences
 Corresponding Member of the International Academy of Engineering Sciences
 Honorary Professor, Omsk State University
 Professor Emeritus of Omsk Academy of Interior Ministry

References 

1940 births
Living people
Communist Party of the Soviet Union members
People from Omsk
Recipients of the Order "For Merit to the Fatherland", 3rd class
Recipients of the Order of Honour (Russia)
Governors of Omsk Oblast
Members of the Federation Council of Russia (1994–1996)
Members of the Federation Council of Russia (1996–2000)
United Russia politicians
21st-century Russian politicians
Omsk State Agrarian University alumni